Robert Waterman McChesney (born December 22, 1952) is an American professor notable in the history and political economy of communications, and the role media play in democratic and capitalist societies. He is the Gutgsell Endowed Professor in the Department of Communication at the University of Illinois at Urbana–Champaign. He co-founded the Free Press, a national media reform organization. In 2002–12, he hosted Media Matters, a weekly radio program every Sunday afternoon on WILL (AM), Illinois Public Media radio.

Background and education
McChesney was born in Cleveland, Ohio to Samuel Parker McChesney, an advertising salesman for This Week magazine, and his wife Edna Margaret "Meg" (née McCorkle) McChesney, a nurse. He attended The Evergreen State College in Olympia, Washington, where he studied history and political economy.

Career
After college, McChesney worked for a time as a sports stringer for United Press International (UPI), and published a weekly newspaper. In 1979 he was the founding publisher of The Rocket, a Seattle-based rock magazine that chronicled the birth of the Seattle rock scene of the late 1980s and 1990s.

He gradually began to report on the media itself and became an expert in the field, entering academic studies in this area. He did graduate work at the University of Washington, obtaining a PhD in Communications there in 1989. McChesney has published several books about the media, politics and contemporary United States society. (See below). 

He is the Gutgsell Endowed Professor in the Department of Communication of the University of Illinois at Urbana–Champaign.

Assessment of the media

McChesney has said the term "deregulated media" is a misnomer. He describes media organizations as a government-sanctioned oligopoly, owned by a few highly profitable corporate entities. They have legislative influence and control news coverage, and can distort public understanding of media issues.

In his article "Farewell To Journalism" (October 2012), McChesney described what he considered the deterioration of the current US media system; he said that this freefall threatens the democratic system itself. He highlights what scholars believe to be the key characteristics of healthy journalism, and says, "It is necessary...that the media system as a whole makes such journalism a realistic expectation for the citizenry."

McChesney proposed a $200 annual Citizenship News Voucher to support journalism.

Bibliography

See also
 Fourth Estate
 Fifth Estate

References

External links
 Robert W. McChesney bibliography  
 Micha Odenheimer, "Your Free Internet is in Danger", Interview with Professor Robert W. McChesney at acheret.co.il
 

1952 births
Living people
American male journalists
American media critics
Mass media theorists
American political writers
American radio personalities
Evergreen State College alumni
University of Washington alumni
Indymedia
University of Illinois Urbana-Champaign faculty
University of Wisconsin–Madison faculty
Writers from Cleveland